Mastax is a genus of beetles in the family Carabidae, containing the following 52 species:

 Mastax albonotata Peringuey, 1885
 Mastax alternans Basilewsky, 1959
 Mastax annulata Andrewes, 1924
 Mastax brittoni Quentin, 1952
 Mastax burgeoni Liebke, 1934
 Mastax carissima Bates, 1892
 Mastax confusa Basilewsky, 1959
 Mastax congoensis Basilewsky, 1987
 Mastax elegantula Schmidt-Gobel, 1846
 Mastax euanthes Andrewes, 1924
 Mastax extrema Peringuey, 1896
 Mastax florida Andrewes, 1924
 Mastax formosana Dupuis, 1912
 Mastax fortesculpta Basilewsky, 1988
 Mastax fulvonotata Quentin, 1952
 Mastax gestroi Bates, 1892
 Mastax hargreavesi Liebke, 1931
 Mastax histrio Fabricius, 1801
 Mastax humilis Andrewes, 1936
 Mastax kivuensis Basilewsky, 1959
 Mastax klapperichi Jedlicka, 1956
 Mastax kulti Basilewsky, 1949  
 Mastax laeviceps Bates, 1891
 Mastax latefasciata Liebke, 1931
 Mastax liebkei Burgeon, 1937
 Mastax louwerensi Andrewes, 1936
 Mastax moesta Schmidt-Goebel, 1846
 Mastax nana Basilewsky, 1949
 Mastax nepalensis Morvan, 1977
 Mastax ochraceonotata Pic, 1912
 Mastax okavango Basilewsky, 1988
 Mastax ornata Schidt-Goebel, 1846
 Mastax ornatella Boheman, 1848
 Mastax pakistana Jedlicka, 1963
 Mastax parreyssi Chaudoir, 1850
 Mastax philippina Jedlicka, 1935
 Mastax poecila Schaum, 1863
 Mastax pulchella Dejean, 1831
 Mastax pygmaea Andrewes, 1930
 Mastax raffrayi Chaudoir, 1876
 Mastax rawalpindi Jedlicka, 1963
 Mastax royi Basilewsky, 1969
 Mastax rugiceps Bates, 1892
 Mastax saganicola G.Muller, 1942
 Mastax senegalensis Liebke, 1934
 Mastax striaticeps Chaudoir, 1876
 Mastax subornatella Basilewsky, 1958
 Mastax sudanica Basilewsky, 1959
 Mastax tessmanni Liebke, 1934
 Mastax thermarum Steven, 1806
 Mastax tratorius Basilewsky, 1962
 Mastax vegeta Andrewes, 1924

References

Brachininae
Adephaga genera